Rutulsky District is an administrative and municipal district (raion), one of the forty-one in the Republic of Dagestan, Russia. It is located in the south of the republic. Its administrative center is the rural locality (a selo) of Rutul. As of the 2010 Census, the total population of the district was 22,926, with the population of Rutul accounting for 18.0% of that number.

Administrative and municipal status
Within the framework of administrative divisions, Rutulsky District is one of the forty-one in the Republic of Dagestan. The district is divided into eleven selsoviets which comprise forty rural localities. As a municipal division, the district is incorporated as Rutulsky Municipal District. Its eleven selsoviets are incorporated as seventeen rural settlements within the municipal district. The selo of Rutul serves as the administrative center of both the administrative and municipal district.

Demographics
Ethnic composition (according to the 2010 Census)
Rutuls 58.16%
Tsakhurs 23.01%
Lezgins 9.32%
Laks 3.77%
Avars 2.71%
Azerbaijanis 1.56%
Russians 0.13%
Others 0.13%

References

Notes

Sources

 
Districts of Dagestan